Oxycerina is a genus of flies in the family Stratiomyidae.

Species
Oxycerina hauseri Rozkošný & Woodley, 2010
Oxycerina merzi Rozkošný & Woodley, 2010
Oxycerina sabaha Rozkošný & Woodley, 2010

References

Stratiomyidae
Brachycera genera
Diptera of Asia